The 1999 Primestar 500 was the sixth stock car race of the 1999 NASCAR Winston Cup Series season and the 40th iteration of the event. The race was held on Sunday, March 28, 1999, in Fort Worth, Texas at Texas Motor Speedway, a 1.5 miles (2.4 km) permanent tri-oval shaped racetrack. The race took the scheduled 334 laps to complete. Nearing the end of the race, Hendrick Motorsports driver Terry Labonte would make a late-race move to pass Robert Yates Racing driver Dale Jarrett for the lead. With three to go, the caution would come out for Jimmy Spencer, handing the win to Labonte. The win was Labonte's 21st career NASCAR Winston Cup Series victory and his only victory of the season. To fill out the podium, Jarrett and Joe Gibbs Racing driver Bobby Labonte would finish second and third, respectively.

Background 

Texas Motor Speedway is a speedway located in the northernmost portion of the U.S. city of Fort Worth, Texas – the portion located in Denton County, Texas. The track measures 1.5 miles (2.4 km) around and is banked 24 degrees in the turns, and is of the oval design, where the front straightaway juts outward slightly. The track layout is similar to Atlanta Motor Speedway and Charlotte Motor Speedway (formerly Lowe's Motor Speedway). The track is owned by Speedway Motorsports, Inc., the same company that owns Atlanta and Charlotte Motor Speedway, as well as the short-track Bristol Motor Speedway.

Entry list 

 (R) denotes rookie driver.

Practice 
Originally, four practice sessions were scheduled to be held, with two on Friday and two on Saturday. However, due to rain, the second practice session on Saturday was cancelled.

First practice 
The first practice session was held on Friday, March 26, at 11:00 AM CST. The session would last for one hour and 15 minutes.

Second practice 
The second practice session was held on Friday, March 26, at 1:05 PM CST. The session would last for one hour and 20 minutes.

Final practice 
The final practice session, sometimes referred to as Happy Hour, was held on Saturday, March 27, at 9:00 AM CST. The session would last for one hour.

Qualifying 
Qualifying was split into two rounds. The first round was held on Friday, March 26, at 3:30 PM CST. Each driver would have one lap to set a time. During the first round, the top 25 drivers in the round would be guaranteed a starting spot in the race. If a driver was not able to guarantee a spot in the first round, they had the option to scrub their time from the first round and try and run a faster lap time in a second round qualifying run, held on Saturday, March 27, at 10:45 AM CST. As with the first round, each driver would have one lap to set a time. Positions 26-36 would be decided on time, while positions 37-43 would be based on provisionals. Six spots are awarded by the use of provisionals based on owner's points. The seventh is awarded to a past champion who has not otherwise qualified for the race. If no past champion needs the provisional, the next team in the owner points will be awarded a provisional.

Four drivers would fail to qualify: Dick Trickle, Kyle Petty, Dave Marcis, and Stanton Barrett.

Full qualifying results 

*Time not available.

Race results

References 

1999 NASCAR Winston Cup Series
NASCAR races at Texas Motor Speedway
March 1999 sports events in the United States
1999 in sports in Texas